Anne Higonnet is an American art historian. She is Ann Whitney Olin Professor at Barnard College.

Biography 
Higonnet received her BA from Harvard University in 1980 and PhD from Yale University in 1988. She was an assistant professor at Wellesley College before joining the Barnard College faculty.

Higonnet's scholarship focuses on 19th century art, art collecting, and the history of childhood. She created an online project with the Morgan Library & Museum on fashion plates from the Journal des Dames et des Modes from 1797 to 1804 to demonstrate the revolution in women's fashion during the early 19th century, namely, how women turned their underwear into outerwear, adopted Indian textiles, and invented the handbag. She is a biographer of Berthe Morisot.

Her students include Denise Murrell, curator at the Metropolitan Museum of Art.

Higonnet was a 2019-2020 Radcliffe fellow. She also received a 2001 Guggenheim Fellowship.

She is currently married to Yale University economist John Geanakoplos.

References 

Living people
Barnard College faculty
American art historians
Harvard University alumni
Yale University alumni
Radcliffe College people
Wellesley College faculty
Year of birth missing (living people)